Eyes are the organs of vision.

Eyes or The Eyes can also refer to:

Music
 The Eyes (band), a 1960s psychedelic rock band from London, England
 "Eyes" (Donna Summer song), 1985
 "Eyes", a song by Tracy Bonham from her album Blink the Brightest
 "Eyes", a song by Kaskade, featuring Mindy Gledhill, from Kaskade's album Fire & Ice
"The Eyes", a song on David Byrne and Brian Eno's 2008 album Everything That Happens Will Happen Today
 Eyes (Eddy Raven album), 1980

Television
 Eyes (TV series), a 2005 American television series
 "Eyes" (Babylon 5), a 1994 episode of the science-fiction TV series Babylon 5
 "Eyes" (Space: Above and Beyond episode), an episode of Space: Above and Beyond
 "The Eyes", episode 2 of season 2 of the animated TV series Adventure Time, first aired in 2010
 "Eyes", a segment from the 1969 horror anthology Night Gallery

Other uses
 Eyes (cheese), holes in cheese
 Eyes Galaxies, in the constellation Virgo
 Eyes (video game), a 1982 arcade game
 The Eyes (film), a 2016 American crime drama film
The Eyes, a 1999 book of poetry by Don Paterson

See also
 Eye (disambiguation)
 Eyeball (disambiguation)